The Goya Award for Best Sound (Spanish: Premio Goya al mejor sonido) is one of the Goya Awards, Spain's principal national film awards. The category was first presented at the first edition of the Goya Awards with Bernardo Menz and Enrique Molinero being the first winners of the category for their work in Werther (1986). Gilles Ortion holds the record of most wins in this category winning eight times, followed by Alfonso Pino with seven wins.

At the European  Film Awards, Oriol Tarragó won Best Sound Designer for A Monster Calls.

Winners and nominees

1980s

1990s

2000s

2010s

2020s

References

External links
Official site
IMDb: Goya Awards

Goya Awards